Gatis Smukulis (born 15 April 1987) is a Latvian former professional road bicycle racer, who rode professionally between 2009 and 2018 for the , , ,  and  teams. Smukulis won the Latvian National Road Race Championships in 2016, and won six consecutive Latvian National Time Trial Championships between 2011 and 2016.

Major results

2005
 1st  Overall Trofeo Karlsberg
 2nd Road race, National Road Championships
 7th Road race, UEC European Junior Road Championships
2006
 National Under-23 Road Championships
1st  Road race
1st  Time trial
2007
 1st Riga Grand Prix
 1st Cinturó de l'Empordà
 2nd Overall Grand Prix Guillaume Tell
 4th E.O.S. Tallinn GP
 9th Time trial, UEC European Under-23 Road Championships
2008
 1st  Time trial, National Under-23 Road Championships
 1st Les Boucles du Sud Ardèche
 1st Ronde van Vlaanderen Beloften
 3rd Overall Ronde de l'Isard
1st Stage 1
 9th Time trial, UEC European Under-23 Road Championships
2009
 3rd Time trial, National Road Championships
 5th Overall Coupe des nations Ville Saguenay
2010
 National Road Championships
2nd Road race
3rd Time trial
2011
 National Road Championships
1st  Time trial
4th Road race
 1st Stage 1 Volta a Catalunya
2012
 1st  Time trial, National Road Championships
2013
 National Road Championships
1st  Time trial
2nd Road race
2014
 National Road Championships
1st  Time trial
3rd Road race
2015
 1st  Time trial, National Road Championships
 1st Prologue (TTT) Tour of Austria
 7th Time trial, European Games
2016
 National Road Championships
1st  Time trial
1st  Road race
  Combativity award Stage 13 Vuelta a España
2017
 4th Time trial, National Road Championships
2018
 2nd Time trial, National Road Championships
 10th Overall Tour of Almaty

Grand Tour general classification results timeline

References

External links
 
 

1987 births
Living people
People from Valka
Latvian male cyclists
Olympic cyclists of Latvia
Cyclists at the 2008 Summer Olympics
European Games competitors for Latvia
Cyclists at the 2015 European Games